HMS Acheron was the last  wooden paddle sloop ordered for the Royal Navy. She was launched at Sheerness in 1838. She spent two commissions in the Mediterranean before being reclassed as a survey ship in 1847. Between 1848 and 1851 she made a coastal survey of New Zealand, the first such survey since Captain Cook. She was paid off at Sydney and was tender to HMS Calliope. She was sold at Sydney in 1855.

Acheron was the second named vessel since it was used for an 8-gun Bomb, purchased in October 1803 then captured by the French in the Mediterranean and burnt on 3 February 1805.

Construction
She was initially ordered from Chatham Dockyard on 15 September 1837, but three days later this was changed to Sheerness Dockyard because the relevant tooling was already present there. The Vessel was named on 27 September and laid down in October. She was launched on 23 August 1838. She was completed for sea at Sheerness om 8 January 1839 at a first cost of 25,509 (including 16,819 for and rigging and 8,690 for machinery).

Commissioned service

First commission
She was commissioned on 27 November 1838 under the command of Lieutenant Andrew Kennedy, RN for the Mediterranean. She returned to Home Waters, paying off in December 1841.

Second commission
Her second commission commenced on 3 December 1842 under the command of Lieutenant Benjamin Alpin, RN for the Mediterranean. On 10 September 1846 Lieutenant Andrew Robert Dunlap took command. She returned to Home Waters and paid off at Woolwich on 13 October 1847.

Commissioned as survey ship
Acheron was commissioned the next day on 14 October 1847, under the command of Captain John Lort Stokes, RN, for service on the East Indies Station as a survey ship. She was dispatched to New Zealand in January 1849, arriving in November the same year. In March 1851, due to a budget cut to the Hydrographer of the Navy, Acheron was ordered to be laid up in Sydney, New South Wales and her crew returned to England. However, in November 1851, she was sent to rescue the passengers and crew of the British merchant ship Syrian, which had run aground on the Elizabeth Reef whilst on a voyage from Wellington, New Zealand to Sydney. In July 1853, she rescued the passengers and crew of the British barque Tory, which had been wrecked north of Port Stephens, New South Wales.

Disposition
Acheron was sold at Sydney on 23 April 1855 for £2,067 16s.

Notes

Citations

References
 Lyon Winfield, The Sail & Steam Navy List, All the Ships of the Royal Navy 1815 to 1889, by David Lyon & Rif Winfield, published by Chatham Publishing, London © 2004, 
 Winfield, British Warships in the Age of Sail (1817 – 1863), by Rif Winfield, published by Seaforth Publishing, England © 2014, e, Chapter 11 Steam Paddle Vessels, Vessels acquired since November 1830, Hermes Class
 Colledge, Ships of the Royal Navy, by J.J. Colledge, revised and updated by Lt Cdr Ben Warlow and Steve Bush, published by Seaforth Publishing, Barnsley, Great Britain, © 2020, e  (EPUB)
 The Navy List, published by His Majesty's Stationery Office, London

 

Paddle sloops of the Royal Navy
1838 ships
Maritime history of New Zealand